Let Me Be Your Knight is a South Korean television series directed by Ahn Ji-sook and written by Seo Jeong-eun and Yoo So-won. Starring Jung In-sun along with members of fictitious band Luna: Lee Jun-young, Jang Dong-joo, Kim Jong-hyun, Kim Dong-hyun and Yoon Ji-sung, the series depicts a romance between a world star idol suffering from sleepwalking and a resident doctor who has to secretly treat it. The series premiered on SBS TV on November 7, 2021, and aired every Sunday, at 23:05 (KST) till January 24, 2022. It is available for streaming on iQIYI in selected territories.

Synopsis
This series follows the lead singer of a popular idol band Luna, Yoon Tae-in who suffers from sleepwalking. To cure his condition secretly, he seeks help from a live-in doctor In Yoon-ju to cure his condition.

Cast and characters

Main
 Jung In-sun as 
In Yoon-joo, 29 years old, get mistaken as her sister, a doctor, and becomes the live-in doctor who treats Yoon Tae-in for his condition.
 Kang Seon-joo, 29 years old, Yoon-ju's identical twin sister who is a sleep disorder doctor, her American name is Catherine Seon-joo Kang, and her Korean was In Seon-joo. She was adopted in the United States by a couple at the age of 11.

Luna members
 Lee Jun-young as Yoon Tae-in - 25 years old, Luna's leader, main vocalist, producer.
 Jang Dong-joo as Seo Woo-yeon, 25 years old - Luna's guitarist and sub vocalist who develops a crush on Yoon-joo thinking she's Seon-joo.
 Kim Jong-hyun as Lee Shin - 23 years old, Luna's bassist, sub vocalist.
 Yoon Ji-sung as Kim Yoo-chan - 26 years old, Luna's drummer and sub vocalist.
 Kim Dong-hyun as Woo Ga-on - 21 years old, Luna's keyboardist, sub vocalist.

Others
 Kim Kyung-ho as No Sang-hoon, in late 20's, member of new idol group Bluemoon.
 Seo Hye-won as Jeong Ba-reun- 29 years old, Yoon-ju's best friend, cafe owner
 Shin Ha-young as Chae Ji-yeon- 29 years old, she is in a secret relationship with Luna's Lee Shin, Jang Enter's actor
 Kwak Jae-hyung as Representative Moon- in late 40s, CEO of MM Entertainment, to which Luna belongs
 Choi Hwani as Gil Soonnam- 29 years old, employee of MM Entertainment, Manager/ Director of 'Luna' 
 Lee Se-chang as Representative Jang, in late 40s, CEO of entertainment agency Jang Entertainment. Daughter is Ji-yeon.
 Park Ji-won as Hyobin- 21 years old, a member of MM Entertainment, one of the top solo singers in Korea. She likes Shin. 
 Joo-ah as Kim Yeon-jeong, broadcast station writer
 Park So-eun as Hong Jae-eun is an employee of MM Entertainment's PR team.

Special appearance 
 Lee Jae-yoon as judo master
 Kang Ji-young as Nina 
A singer-songwriter artist from Luna's agency

Production
Lee Jun-young was confirmed to appear  as the main character in the series on November 22, 2019. On August 30, 2021, the cast of the miniseries was confirmed. It was revealed that Jung In-sun, Lee Jun-young, Jang Dong-joo, Kim Jong-hyun, singer Yoon Ji-sung, and Kim Dong-hyun will be appearing as main characters in the series. Script reading site was revealed on September 28 by releasing photographs. One week later, on October 5 behind-the-scenes footage of the Luna band ensemble was released.

Release
Let Me Be Your Knight is released in Japan, Hong Kong, Taiwan, Malaysia, Indonesia, the Philippines, Vietnam, and Thailand, as well as all over Southeast Asia, North America, South America, Australia, Europe, and the Middle East. On September 9, it was reported that Japan has signed a contract with Corpus Korea, a company specialising in overseas distribution of Hallyu content. In Southeast Asia and Taiwan iQIYI International and in Hong Kong Now TV will air the series. Viki will be streaming the series in America, Europe, Australia, and the Middle East. It premiered in South Korea on SBS TV on November 7, 2021, and aired every Sunday, at 23:05 (KST).

Original soundtrack

Part 1

Part 2

Part 3

Part 4

Ratings

Awards and nominations

Notes

References

External links
  
 Let Me Be Your Knight at Daum 
  Let Me Be Your Knight at Naver 
 

Seoul Broadcasting System television dramas
2021 South Korean television series debuts
2022 South Korean television series endings
Korean-language television shows
South Korean comedy-drama television series
South Korean musical television series